Gerhard Pfaffenbichler (born 26 March 1961 in Salzburg) is an Austrian former alpine skier who competed in the 1988 Winter Olympics.

References

External links
 
 

1961 births
Living people
Austrian male alpine skiers
Olympic alpine skiers of Austria
Alpine skiers at the 1988 Winter Olympics
Sportspeople from Salzburg
20th-century Austrian people